Dane Carlaw (born 21 February 1980 in Brisbane, Queensland) is an Australian former professional rugby league footballer who played in the 2000s and 2010s. An Australia national and Queensland State of Origin representative forward, he played in Australia for National Rugby League club, the Brisbane Broncos (with whom he won the 2000 and 2006 NRL Premierships) and in France for Super League club, Catalans Dragons.

Playing career
While attending Padua College, Carlaw played for the Australian Schoolboys team in 1997.

A reliable workhorse in the second row, Carlaw won the Broncos' rookie of the year award in 2000 and also tasted premiership success with the club at the end of his first season, playing at prop in the 2000 NRL grand final victory over the Sydney Roosters.  He has represented Queensland and, at his peak, Australia.

At the end of the 2001 NRL season, he went on the 2001 Kangaroo tour.  In Game 3 of the 2002 State of Origin series, Carlaw scored a try for Queensland with 42 seconds left to tie the match at 18-18 and the series at one game a piece.  As the match was tied and due to Queensland winning the shield a year prior, Queensland retained the shield by default.

In the 2006 NRL Grand Final Carlaw was selected to play from the interchange bench for Brisbane who won the match, claiming another premiership. As 2006 NRL Premiers, the Brisbane Broncos travelled to England to face 2006 Super League champions, St Helens R.F.C. in the 2007 World Club Challenge. Carlaw played as a prop forward in the Broncos' 14-18 loss.

Carlaw moved to Catalans after the 2007 NRL season. In 2010 he became eligible to play for France after having spent three years playing in the country.

On 30 November 2010, he re-signed with Brisbane Broncos on a one-year deal  He played for the Wynnum Manly Seagulls in the 2011 Queensland Cup.

References

 2001 Ashes profile 

1980 births
Living people
Australia national rugby league team players
Australian rugby league players
Brisbane Broncos players
Catalans Dragons players
People educated at Padua College (Brisbane)
Queensland Rugby League State of Origin players
Rugby league players from Brisbane
Rugby league props
Rugby league second-rows
Wynnum Manly Seagulls players